The Ministry of Panchayati Raj  is a branch of the Government of India. Ministry of Panchayati Raj looks into all matters relating to the Panchayati Raj and Panchayati Raj Institutions. It was created in May 2004. The ministry is headed by a minister of cabinet rank / Minister of State and transfers grants to rural local bodies for civic programs such as maintenance and construction of roads, pavements, bridges, drainage systems, parks, piped water supply, streetlights etc.

In a federation, the powers and functions of the government are divided among two governments. In India it is the Union Government and the various State Governments. However, with the passage of the 73rd and 74th amendment act of the Constitution of India, in 1993 the division of powers and functions have been further trickled down to Local Self Governments (Panchayat at Village levels and Municipalities and Municipal Corporations in towns and large cities). As such India now has not two but three tiers of Government in its federal setup.

Functions of the Ministry

Ministry of Panchayati Raj is responsible for the work of advocacy for and monitoring of the implementation of Constitution 73rd Amendment Act the  Provisions of the Panchayats (Extension to Scheduled Areas) Act 1996.

E-PANCHAYAT

As per the World Bank, "E-Government refers to the use by government agencies of information technologies (such as Wide Area Networks, the Internet, and mobile computing) that have the ability to transform relations with citizens, businesses, and other arms of government." Government of India (GoI), with an intention to transform the governance landscape by ensuring participation of citizens in policy making and providing ease of access to information to the citizens, introduced the National e-Governance Plan (NeGP) in 2006. The vision of the NeGP was to "Make all Government services accessible to the common man in his locality, through common service delivery outlets and ensure efficiency, transparency & reliability of such services at affordable costs to realise the basic needs of the common man." e- Panchayat is one of the Mission Mode Project (MMP), currently being implemented with a vision to empower and transform rural India.

As a first step towards formulating the project, the Ministry of Panchayati Raj constituted an Expert Group in June, 2007 under the Chairmanship of Dr. B.K. Gairola, Director General, NIC, Government of India. The Expert Group was entrusted with the task of assessing the IT Programmes of Ministry of Panchayati Raj and recommending cost effective solutions along with the cost implications. Adopting a consultative approach, the Committee interacted with the States/UTs to assess the existing status of computerisation up to the Gram Panchayat level, including the initiatives undertaken by the State Governments. In order to understand the ground realities, the Committee conducted field visits to some of the Gram Panchayats in the selected rural areas where some IT initiatives had been undertaken. Inputs from eminent experts in the public and private sector were also taken into account as part of the consultative process. In essence, it found that while some computerisation efforts had already been made at Panchayat level by States like Gujarat, West Bengal, Karnataka, Kerala, Andhra Pradesh and Goa, these attempts were limited as they were driven by short term goals and were unable to completely transform Panchayats due to lack of a holistic perspective. It was felt that a more comprehensive approach was required to make a cognisable impact on the functioning of the Panchayats for the benefit of the citizens. These recommendations formed the basis for the conceptualisation of ePanchayat MMP.

The e-Panchayat project holds great promise for the rural masses as it aims to transform the Panchayati Raj Institutions (PRIs) into symbols of modernity, transparency and efficiency. This is one of its kind nationwide IT initiative introduced by Ministry of Panchayati Raj that endeavours to ensure people's participation in programme decision making, implementation and delivery. The project aims to automate the functioning of the 2.45 lakh Panchayats in the country. The project addresses all aspects of Panchayats' functioning including Planning, Monitoring, Implementation, Budgeting, Accounting, Social Audit and delivery of citizen services like issue of certificates, licenses etc.

List of Ministers
The Ministry was created on May 27, 2004, with Mani Shankar Aiyar being the first minister.

List of Ministers of State

See also
 National Panchayati Raj Day
 E-Panchayat Mission Mode Project

References

External links 
 

2004 establishments in India
Government agencies established in 2004
Panchayati raj (India)
Panchayati Raj